Richard Corts (16 July 1905 – 7 August 1974)  was a German sprinter who competed at the 1928 Summer Olympics. He won a silver medal in the 4 × 100 m relay, together with Georg Lammers, Hubert Houben and Helmut Körnig, and failed to reach the final of individual 100 m event.

Corts won the national 100 m title in 1925 and 1928. He set a European record over 100 m in 1925 (10.5) and equaled the world record of 10.4 in 1928. He was part of the German 4 × 100 m relay team that set a world record at 40.8 in 1928.

Corts retired from athletics in 1930. After completing a professional studying in Helsinki for two years, he took over his father's knife factory (Josua Corts) in his native Remscheid. He committed suicide at the age of 69.

References

1905 births
1974 suicides
Athletes (track and field) at the 1928 Summer Olympics
German male sprinters
Olympic athletes of Germany
Olympic silver medalists for Germany
People from Remscheid
Sportspeople from Düsseldorf (region)
People from the Rhine Province
Suicides in Germany
Medalists at the 1928 Summer Olympics
Olympic silver medalists in athletics (track and field)